The Rover P6 series (named as the 2000, 2200, or 3500, depending on engine displacement) was a saloon car produced by Rover and subsequently British Leyland from 1963 to 1977 in Solihull, Warwickshire, England, UK.

The P6 was the first winner of the European Car of the Year award.

Development

The P6 was announced on 9 October 1963, just before the Earls Court Motor Show. The vehicle was marketed first as the Rover 2000 and was a complete "clean sheet" design intended to appeal to a larger number of buyers than earlier models such as the P4 it replaced. Rover had identified a developing market between the standard '1.5-litre' saloon car class (such as the Ford Consul and the Singer Gazelle) and the accepted 'three-litre' large saloon cars (typified by the Wolseley 6/99 and the Vauxhall Cresta). Younger and increasingly affluent professional workers and executives were seeking out cars that were superior to the normal 1.5-litre models in style, design and luxury but which offered more modern driving dynamics than the big three-litre class and lower purchase and running costs than sports saloons such as the Jaguar Mark 2. Automotive technology had improved significantly in the mid-to-late 1950s, typified by the introduction of cars such as the Citroën DS and Lancia Flavia in Europe and the Chevrolet Corvair in America. The replacement for the traditionally-designed P4 would therefore be a smaller car with a two-litre engine (although a gas turbine was envisioned as power unit in the future) utilising the latest design, engineering and styling, thus making the Rover one of the earliest examples of what would now be classified as an executive car. The P6 would be lower-priced than the P4 and sales volumes were anticipated to be significantly higher. The more upmarket and conservative P5 was sold alongside the P6 until 1973.

The 2000 was advanced for the time with a de Dion tube suspension at the rear, four-wheel disc brakes (inboard on the rear), and a fully synchromesh transmission. The unibody design featured non-stressed panels bolted to a unit frame, inspired by the Citroën DS. The de Dion set-up was unique in that the "tube" was in two parts that could telescope, thereby avoiding the need for sliding splines in the drive shafts, with consequent stiction under drive or braking torque, while still keeping the wheels vertical and parallel in relation to the body.

The Rover 2000 won industry awards for safety when it was introduced and included a carefully designed "safety" interior.  One innovative feature was the prism of plastic on the top of the front side lights.  This allowed the driver to see the front corner of the car in low light conditions, and also confirmed that they were operative. The relatively sharp plastic projections did not meet homologation standards in some export markets, including Germany, however and so a lens with a smooth top was substituted where the law demanded.

One unique feature of the Rover 2000 was the design of the front suspension system, in which a bell crank (an L-shaped rotating bracket trailing the upper hub carrier joint) conveyed the vertical motion of the wheel to a fore-and-aft-horizontally mounted spring fastened to the rear wall of the engine compartment. A single hydraulically damped arm was mounted on the bulkhead for the steering. The front suspension was designed to allow as much width for the engine compartment as possible so that Rover's gas turbine engine could be fitted. The styling outline was first seen in the 1961 prototype T4, a front-engined front-wheel-drive gas turbine saloon, one of a line of gas turbine prototypes built by Rover in the 1950s and 1960s. T4 survives today and can be seen at the British Motor Museum.

In the event, the gas turbine engine was never used for the production vehicle, but the engine compartment width (with slightly amended shape) did facilitate the accommodation of the Buick-derived Rover V8 engine made available in the P6 from April 1968.

Sculptor Flaminio Bertoni's Citroën DS body inspired David Bache. With a nod to the new Kamm tail, the finished Rover appearance incorporated a necessarily enlarged boot filled otherwise by Rover's de Dion rear suspension. It lacked the Citroën shark nose, which it was planned to introduce later as a drooping bonnet with headlamps in pods and projecting sidelights.

Luggage compartment space was limited due to the complex rear suspension and, in Series II vehicles, the boot mounted battery. The spare wheel competed for space also, and was stored either flat on the boot floor or vertically to the side. A later optional 'touring package' allowed the spare to be carried on the boot lid; with a vinyl weatherproof cover. When not in place, the mounting bracket was concealed by a circular Rover badge. Series II models briefly offered Dunlop Denovo Run-flat tyre, eliminating the need for a spare, though this was not commonly selected and is very unusual on surviving examples.

The car's primary competitor on the domestic UK market was the Triumph 2000, also released in October 1963, just one week after the P6. In continental Europe, the Rover 2000 competed in the same sector as the Citroën DS which, like the initial Rover offering, was offered only with a four-cylinder engine – a situation which was resolved in the Rover when the V8 was engineered to fit into the engine bay. The Rover 2000 interior was not as spacious as those of its Triumph and Citroën rivals, especially in the back, where its sculpted two-person rear seat implied that customers wishing to accommodate three in the back of a Rover should opt for the larger and older Rover P5.

Series I

2000

The first P6 used a 2.0 L engine designed specifically for the P6. Although it was announced towards the end of 1963, the car had been in "pilot production" since the beginning of the year, therefore deliveries were able to begin immediately. At the time the engine was unusual in having an overhead camshaft layout. The cylinder head had a perfectly flat surface, and the combustion chambers were cast into the piston crowns (sometimes known as a Heron head). With the rapid construction of motorways around the world, many of which (including those in the United Kingdom in this period) had no upper speed limits, the P6's engine was developed to be efficient, smooth and reliable when driven at high speeds for long periods. It had 'square' dimensions where the cylinder bore and stroke were the same (85.7 mm or 3.4 in) to minimise piston speeds and bearing loads, which was very unusual amongst British saloon cars: these tended to have under-square (long stroke) engines, a lingering legacy of the pre-1947 horsepower tax system and the driving conditions encountered on British roads in the pre-motorway era. 

Cars that were built until 1966 are referred to as early cars. The Rover 2000 had many detailed differences that changed over the first 3 years of production. Items such as exhaust systems, gear linkages and most visibly the front valance. It had vertical slats and was curved with no extra bumps which gave the car the nick name "sharks tooth". Also on these cars the boot-shuts and the door-shuts of the base unit were painted body colour. The cars varied very slightly in appearance because radio aerials, a heated rear window and a locking fuel cap were optional extras. Early instrument panels were not made of plastic. The speedometer only went up to 110 mph and the centre console and pedals were different on later cars.

There are a number of very early cars still in existence in some form. The earliest surviving production P6 is 102 FJJ which has a good number of original panels. It is being rebuilt around a 1965 base unit. Three of the FLK cars exist 143, 145 and 149, two of which have been lovingly restored. The gold car or the 100th 2000 off the production line also survives in restored condition.

Rover later developed a derivative of the engine by fitting twin SU carburettors and a redesigned top end and marketed the revised specification vehicles as the 2000 TC. The 2000 TC was launched in March 1966 for export markets in North America and continental Europe. Limited availability of the redesigned induction manifold needed for the twin-carburetter engine was given as one reason for restricting the 2000 TC to overseas sales. The manufacturers also stated pointedly that the UK's recently introduced blanket 70 mph (113 km/h) speed limit would make the extra speed of the new car superfluous on the domestic market. Fortunately for performance-oriented UK buyers, supplies of the redesigned inlet manifold must have improved and the company relented in time for the London Motor Show in October 1966 when the 2000 TC became available for the UK market. The 2000 TC prototypes had run in the Rally of Great Britain as part of their test programme. It featured a bigger starter motor and tachometer as standard and was identifiable by "TC" initials on the bodywork. The standard specification engines continued in production in vehicles designated as 2000 SC models. These featured the original single SU.

3500

Rover saw Buick's compact 3.5 L (3528 cc/215 in³) V8 from the Buick Special as a way to differentiate the P6 from its chief rival, the Triumph 2000. They purchased the rights to the innovative aluminium engine and once it was modified to allow its use by Rover, it became an instant hit. The Rover V8 engine, as it became known, outlived its original host, the P5B, by more than thirty years.

The 3500 was introduced in April 1968 (one year after the Rover company was purchased by Triumph's owner, Leyland) and continued to be offered until 1977. The manufacturer asserted that the light metal V8 engine weighed the same as the four-cylinder unit of the Rover 2000, and the more powerful car's maximum speed of 114 mph (183 km/h) as well as its 10.5-second acceleration time from 0–60 mph (97 km/h) were considered impressive, and usefully faster than most of the cars with which, on the UK market, the car competed on price and specifications.  (The glaring exception was the Jaguar 340, which was substantially quicker than the Rover 3500 and was advertised at a 15 per cent lower manufacturer's recommended price, the Jaguar representing exceptional value as a "run-out" model, to be replaced later in 1968 by the Jaguar XJ6.)

It was necessary to modify the under-bonnet space to squeeze the V8 engine into the P6 engine bay: the front suspension cross-member had to be relocated forward, while a more visible change was an extra air intake beneath the front bumper to accommodate the larger radiator. There was no longer space under the bonnet for the car's battery, which in the 3500 retreated to a position on the right side of the boot. Nevertheless, the overall length and width of the body were unchanged when compared with the smaller-engined original P6.

Having invested heavily in the car's engine and running gear, the manufacturer left most other aspects of the car unchanged. However, the new Rover 3500 could be readily distinguished from the 2000 thanks to various prominent V8 badges on the outside and beneath the radio. The 3500 was also delivered with a black vinyl covering on the C-pillar, although this decoration later appeared also on four-cylinder cars.

A 3-speed Borg Warner 35 automatic was the only transmission until the 1971 addition of a four-speed manual 3500S model, fitted with a modified version of the gearbox used in the 2000/2200. The letter "S" did not denote "Sport", it was chosen because it stood for something specific on those cars: "Synchromesh". However it is important to note that the 3500S was noticeably quicker than the automatic version of this car with a 0-60 mph time of 9 seconds, compared with 10.1 for the default, i.e. automatic, car. Moreover, due to the fuel-guzzling nature of automatic gearboxes of this era, the manual car's official cycle was 24 mpg compared to the automatic's 22 mpg.

The Rover 3500 was also assembled by Leykor in South Africa. A high compression version was added in 1971, with a high compression version of the V8 producing . The P6 continued in South African assembly until being phased out during 1975; the SD1 arrived in 1977.

Series II

The Series II, or Mark II as it was actually named by Rover, was launched in 1970. All variants carried the battery in the boot and had new exterior fixtures such as a plastic front air intake (to replace the alloy version), new bonnet pressings (with V8 blips even for the 4-cylinder-engined cars) and new rear lights. The interior of the 3500 and 2000TC versions was updated with new instrumentation with circular gauges and rotary switches.  The old-style instrumentation with a linear speedometer and toggle switches continued on the 2000SC versions.

The final years of the Rover P6 coincided with production problems at British Leyland. This was highlighted in August 1975 when Drive, the magazine of the British Automobile Association awarded a trophy to a Rover 3500 as the worst new car in England. It reported that a Rover 3500 purchased in 1974 had covered 6,000 miles (9,600 kilometres) during its first six months, during which period it had consumed three engines, two gearboxes, two clutch housings and needed a complete new set of electrical cables. The car had spent 114 of its first 165 days in a workshop. The runner-up prize in this rogue's gallery was awarded to an Austin Allegro with forty faults reported over ten months, and a Triumph Stag came in third. The story was picked up and reported in other publications, not only domestically but also in Germany, at the time Europe's largest national car market and an important target export market for the company. Further evidence of poor quality control on the 3500 assembly line at the Solihull plant appeared in a report in Autocar magazine in October 1976, surveying the experiences of company car fleet managers with the model, although the report also suggested, apparently wishing to appear even-handed, that at least part of the problem might have arisen from excessively optimistic expectations of the model.

2200

In order to try to meet exhaust emission requirements particularly in California various changes were made to carburation and exhaust. The engine capacity was increased ten percent to increase torque and minimise the loss in reported power output and the 2200 SC and 2200 TC replaced the 2000 SC and TC. Gear boxes on the manual transmission cars were strengthened to cope with the increased low speed torque.

The last 2200 came off the production line on 19 March 1977, a left-hand drive export version that was then converted to right-hand drive by Tourist Trophy Garage, Farnham. The 2200 originally fitted Pirelli Cinturato 165HR14 tyres (CA67) when leaving the factory.

Estates

While Triumph enjoyed considerable success with the estate version of their 2000 saloon, Rover seemed happy to leave that sector of the market entirely open to their old rival. However, Battersea-based coachbuilders FLM Panelcraft picked up Rover's dropped ball and produced their own estate conversion of the P6, called the Estoura. The name is presumably a contraction of the words 'estate' and 'tourer'. Although no actual figure for the production of the estate are known, due to a fire that destroyed the company records, amateur investigations by several Rover enthusiasts show a little over 200 cars were known to have been produced. The first estate was not an approved conversion, but from 1970 onwards the car was marketed (with the factory's blessing) by BL dealers HR Owen Limited and therefore factory warranties were carried forward.

The conversions were completed by H.R. Owen and Crayford Engineering, with bodywork executed by FLM Panelcraft. Crayford's involvement in the project was limited to the interior of the car, and the company had no bearing on the external design of the estate conversion. Nonetheless Crayford badged them as Crayfords for a while (implying that they built them) and only stopped after FLM threatened legal action. Conversions could be carried out at any time in the car's life. Most conversions appear to have been carried out when the cars were 12 months old or older because if a car was converted when new, the conversion would be liable for Purchase Tax like the car itself.

Due to the cost of the conversion (about £800) it would appear that most were carried out on the 3500 rather than on the 2000, with even fewer 2200s made. In comparison with the Triumph 2000 estate, the Rover Estoura was of limited practicality. The quality of the conversion also left a great deal to be desired, with the estate conversion being pop-riveted on to the back end of the modified vehicle, with little rust-proofing or paint applied. As a result, the back end of the vehicles often rusted out, and several estate "pods" were subsequently transferred from one car to another.

NADA models

Rover made an attempt to break into the North American market with the P6, beginning with the Rover 2000 TC. One version of the P6 that was exported was the NADA (North American Dollar Area) model, equipped to a higher standard than UK cars. These are also often referred to today as being "Federal Specification". Notable differences on the outside of the 3500S NADA were wraparound bumpers, three air scoops on the top of the bonnet, front and rear wing reflectors and the "Icelert" on the front grill. The "Icelert" was a sensor which warned the driver of falling outside temperatures and the possibility of ice forming on the road. Inside, depending on the location, the US 3500S was also equipped with electric windows, power steering and air conditioning, all of which are extremely unusual in UK market P6 cars. The earlier 2000 and 2000 TC NADA featured the Icelert system and the side reflectors only. The NADA P6 introduced features which would later appear on the UK Mark II car, including a new instrument cluster and seat piping.

Despite being badged as "3500S" cars, the export models were all fitted with the Borg Warner 35 automatic transmission. The cars were not popular with American buyers, but were sold in Europe instead as they were already converted to left-hand drive. In true British Leyland fashion, several UK cars also ended up with single scoops on their bonnets in an attempt to use up the surplus parts from the now defunct export models. Rover discontinued selling the P6 in North America in 1971: in that year the US had taken fewer than 1,500 Rovers. The company told their US dealers that modifying their cars to meet new US federal safety and pollution requirements would be prohibitively expensive, while experience elsewhere suggests that the Rover four-cylinder engine was particularly hard to adapt for reduced octane lead-free fuels without an unacceptable reduction in the car's performance.

New Zealand production
The Rover 3500 was assembled in New Zealand from 1971 to 1976, at New Zealand Motor Corporation's assembly plant in Stoke, Nelson, alongside the Triumph 2000/2500, Jaguar XJ6 (Series 1 and 2) and Land Rover (Series 3). A notable factor about the Rover 3500 was that it was an export car for New Zealand – 2,400 were shipped to Australia for sale there, in return for CKD kits of the Leyland P76.

Last production model

After a production run of almost 14 years, the last Rover P6 off the production line, registered VVC 700S, was built on 19 March 1977, when it was phased out in favour of the Rover SD1. The SD1 was initially only available with a 3.5 V8 engine from its June 1976 launch, with the 2.3 and 2.6 six-cylinder units joining the range during 1977.

This car was first sent, in August 1977, to the Leyland Historic Vehicle collection, then to Donington Park until 1980, when it was moved to Syon Park along with the rest of the collection, which became the British Motor Industry Heritage Trust Collection. It remained an exhibit at Syon until 1990, when the collection moved to Studley Castle (then owned by Rover) and went into storage until 1993.

In 1993, the collection then moved to its new home, The British Motor Industry Heritage Trust site at Gaydon, now known as the Heritage Motor Centre. VVC 700S was on display until 2003 when it sold at the Bonhams sale of Rover-owned items.

In 2006, VVC revisited Gaydon for the first time since the sale and is still in original condition having never been restored. The car came out of the collection having only ever covered . The last MOT expired in August 2010.

Legacy

The Rover chair, designed by Ron Arad in 1981, incorporated seats from P6 cars.

The P6 was replaced by the Rover SD1.

A Rover P6 and British Police P6 were both included in the Wii, PlayStation 2 and PC game: Classic British Motor Racing, released in 2008.

The character Jack Irish drives a yellow Rover 2000 in the second season of the television series by the same name.

The character George Smiley drives a Rover P6 in the BBC's 1979 mini-series Tinker Tailor Soldier Spy. In the 1982 mini-series sequel Smiley's People he drives another Rover P6, a dark brown N-reg model 2200 SC.

Princess Grace of Monaco was driving a Rover P6 with her daughter when she crashed and died.

Scale models
Corgi Toys; No. 252 (production 1963–66), Rover 2000, approximately O scale (1:44).
Corgi Toys; Nos. 275 and 281 (production 1968–70 and 1971–73), Rover 2000 TC, approximately O-scale (1:44).
Corgi Toys; No 322 (production 1965–66), Rover 2000 "Monte-Carlo Rally" approximately O-scale (1:44).

References

External links

The Rover P6 Club
The P6 Rover Owners Club
Open Forum for all Classic Rover enthusiasts
Rover P6 information by German enthusiast
Private Rover P6 Site by German enthusiast
Federal Rovers site, primarily for the US versions
Rover P6 Australia, Australian Market website history

P6
Executive cars
Sedans
1960s cars
1970s cars
Cars introduced in 1963
Rear-wheel-drive vehicles
British Leyland vehicles
Police vehicles